The Chenab Times is an independent multilingual digital news organisation in India founded in 2017. It is known for publishing news in lesser-known languages, including Sarazi, Bhaderwahi and Gojri.

History
The Chenab Times derives its name from the Chenab River, which flows through the Chenab Valley, which includes the districts of Doda, Kishtwar, and Ramban in the Jammu Division of Jammu and Kashmir, India.

The website was launched in July 2017 in Thathri, Doda by a Kashmiri journalist Anzer Ayoob. It has been covering topics related to development, infrastructure, and healthcare, particularly in the Chenab Valley. It also covers current news across the world.

On 21 January 2021, The Chenab Times started daily short news round-up in various local languages of Chenab Valley, which includes Sarazi and Bhaderwahi languages with additional support of Urdu language. This was the first time Sarazi and Bhaderwahi languages were used for broadcasting news as these languages are endangered.

In 2022, The Chenab Times was nominated for the "Best News Portal Award" by the Pahari Core Committee, an amalgamation of fifteen literary groups in Jammu and Kashmir, for promoting the local Pahari languages.

, The Chenab Times have started publishing news in Gojri under their Multilingual News Initiative (MNI).

External links
Official website

References

2017 establishments in Jammu and Kashmir
Indian news websites
News agencies based in India
Internet properties established in 2017
Publications established in 2017